Traditional ecological knowledge (TEK) describes indigenous and other traditional knowledge of local resources. As a field of study in Northern American anthropology, TEK refers to "a cumulative body of knowledge, belief, and practice, evolving by accumulation of TEK and handed down through generations through traditional songs, stories and beliefs. It is concerned with the relationship of living beings (including human) with their traditional groups and with their environment." Indigenous knowledge is not a universal concept among various societies, but is referred to a system of knowledge traditions or practices that are heavily dependent on "place". Such knowledge is used in natural resource management as a substitute for baseline environmental data in cases where there is little recorded scientific data, or may complement Western scientific methods of ecological management.

The application of TEK in the field of ecological management and science is still controversial, as methods of acquiring and collecting knowledge—although often including forms of empirical research and experimentation—differ from those used to create and validate scientific ecological knowledge from a Western perspective. Non-tribal government agencies, such as the U.S. EPA, have established integration programs with some tribal governments in order to incorporate TEK in environmental plans and climate change tracking.

There is a debate whether Indigenous populations retain an intellectual property right over traditional knowledge and whether use of this knowledge requires prior permission and license. This is especially complicated because TEK is most frequently preserved as oral tradition and as such may lack objectively confirmed documentation. As such, the same methods that could resolve the issue of documentation to meet Western requirements may compromise the very nature of traditional knowledge.

Traditional knowledge is used to maintain resources necessary for survival.  While TEK itself, and the communities tied to the oral tradition, may become threatened in the context of rapid climate change or environmental degradation, TEK is proving critical for understanding the impacts of those changes within the ecosystem.

TEK can also refer to traditional environmental knowledge which emphasizes the different components and interactions of the environment.

Development of the field 
The earliest systematic studies of TEK were conducted in anthropology. Ecological knowledge was studied through the lens of ethnoecology, "an approach that focuses on the conceptions of ecological relationships held by a people or a culture," in understanding how systems of knowledge were developed by a given culture. Harold Colyer Conklin, an American anthropologist who pioneered the study of ethnoscience, took the lead in documenting indigenous ways of understanding the natural world. Conklin and others documented how traditional peoples, such as Philippine horticulturists, displayed remarkable and exceptionally detailed knowledge about the natural history of places where they resided. Direct involvement in gathering, fashioning products from, and using local plants and animals created a scheme in which the biological world and the cultural world were tightly intertwined. In emphasizing the study of adaptive processes, which argues that social organization itself is an ecological adaptational response by a group to its local environment, human-nature relations and the practical techniques on which these relationships and culture depended, the field of TEK could analyze a broad range of questions related to cultural ecology and ecological anthropology.

By the mid-1980s a growing body of literature on traditional ecological knowledge documented both the environmental knowledge held by diverse indigenous peoples and their ecological relations. The rise of traditional ecological knowledge at this time led to international recognition of its potential applications in resource management practices and sustainable development. The 1987 report by the World Commission on Environment and Development reflects the consensus at the time. The report points out that the successes of the 20th century (decreases in infant mortality, increases in life expectancy, increases in literacy, and global food production) have given rise to trends that have caused environmental decay "in an ever more polluted world among ever decreasing resources." Hope, however, existed for traditional lifestyles. The report declared that tribal and indigenous peoples had lifestyles that could provide modern societies with lessons in the management of resources in complex forest, mountain, and dryland ecosystems.

Differences from science

Fulvio Mazzocchi of the Italian National Research Council's Institute of Atmospheric Pollution contrasts traditional knowledge from scientific knowledge as follows:

Aspects of traditional ecological knowledge 
The aspects of traditional ecological knowledge provide different typologies in how it is utilized and understood. These are good indicators in how it is used from different perspectives and how they are interconnected, providing more emphasis on "cooperative management to better identify areas of difference and convergence when attempting to bring two ways of thinking and knowing together."

Factual observations 
Houde identifies six faces of traditional ecological knowledge. The first aspect of traditional ecological knowledge incorporates the factual, specific observations generated by recognition, naming, and classification of discrete components of the environment.  This aspect is about understanding the interrelationship with species and their surrounding environment. It is also a set of both empirical observations and information emphasizing the aspects of animals and their behavior, and habitat, and the physical characteristics of species, and animal abundance. This is most useful for risk assessment and management which provides nations with opportunity to influence resource management. However, if a nation does not act, then the state may act on its own interests. This type of "empirical knowledge consists of a set of generalized observations conducted over a long period of time and reinforced by accounts of other TEK holders."

Management systems
The second face refers to the ethical and sustainable use of resources in regards to management systems. This is achieved through strategic planning to ensure resource conservation. More specifically this face involves dealing with pest management, resource conversion, multiple cropping patterns, and methods for estimating the state of resources.  It also focuses on resource management and how it adapts to local environments.

Past and current uses
The third face refers to the time dimension of TEK, focusing on past and current uses of the environment transmitted through oral history, such as land use, settlement, occupancy, and harvest levels. Specifically medicinal plants and historical sites are great concerns. Oral history is used to transmit cultural heritage generation to generation, and contributes to a sense of family and community.

Ethics and values
The fourth face refers to value statements and connections between the belief system and the organization of facts. In regards to TEK it refers to environmental ethics that keeps exploitative abilities in check. This face also refers to the expression of values concerning the relationship with the habitats of species and their surrounding environment - the human-relationship environment.

Culture and identity
The fifth face refers to the role of language and images of the past giving life to culture. The relationship between Aboriginals (original inhabitants) and their environment is vital to sustaining the cultural components that define them. This face reflects the stories, values, and social relations that reside in places as contributing to the survival, reproduction, and evolution of aboriginal cultures, and identities. It also stresses "the restorative benefits of cultural landscapes as places for renewal"

Cosmology
The sixth face is a culturally based cosmology that is the foundation of the other aspects. Cosmology is the notion of how the world works for many cultures. This can vary greatly from one culture to the next. In the U.S for example, there are over 577 federally recognized tribes with their own culture, languages and belief system. Many of these tribes understand themselves as interconnected with the land. The term 'cosmology' relates to the assumptions and beliefs about how things work, and explains the way in which things are connected, and gives principles that regulate human-animal relations and the role of humans in the world. From an anthropological perspective, cosmology attempts to understand the human-animal relationship and how these directly influence social relationships, obligations toward community members, and management practices.

In A Yupiaq Worldview: A Pathway to Ecology and Spirit by Angayuqaq Oscar Kawagley, an Indigenous anthropologist, says "The balance of nature, or ecological perspective, was of utmost importance to the Yupiaq. History and archeological findings of different race in the world seem to indicate a common philosophical or ecological thread among all people, and this apparent linking leads to the concept of interconnectedness of all things of the universe. The Yupiaq people were, and still are, proponents of this worldview, in spite of the weakening of the ecological perspective by modern intrusions." Kawagley elaborates more on TEK in the Yupiaq worldview by saying that, "The Yupiaq person's methodologies include observation, experience, social interaction, and listening to the conversations and interrogations of the natural and spiritual worlds with the mind. The person is always a participant-observer."

Ecosystem management 

Ecosystem management is a multifaceted and holistic approach to natural resource management. It incorporates both science and traditional ecological knowledge to collect data from long term measures that science cannot. This is achieved by scientists and researchers collaborating with Indigenous peoples through a consensus decision-making process while meeting the socioeconomic, political and cultural needs of current and future generations. Indigenous knowledge has developed a way to deal with the complexity while western science has the techniques and tools. This is a good relationship to have which creates a better outcome for both sides and the environment. The dangers of working together is that nations do not benefit fairly or at all. Many times Indigenous knowledge has been used outside of the nation without consent (cultural appropriation), acknowledgment, or compensation. Indigenous knowledge can sustain the environment, yet it can be sacred knowledge.

Ecological restoration 
Ecological restoration is the practice of restoring a degraded ecosystem through human intervention. There are many links between ecological restoration and ecosystem management practices involving TEK, however TEK ecosystem management is much more in-depth through the historical relationship with the place. Due to the aforementioned unequal power between indigenous and non-indigenous peoples, it is vital that partnerships are equitable to restore social injustices and this has proven to be successful when Indigenous Peoples lead ecological restoration projects.

Traditional knowledge and the U.S. Environmental Protection Agency

The U.S. Environmental Protection Agency was one of the first federal agencies to develop formal policies detailing how it would collaborate with tribal governments and acknowledge tribal interests in enacting its programs "to protect human health and the environment." In recognizing tribal peoples connection to the environment the EPA has sought to develop environmental programs that integrate traditional ecological knowledge into the "agency's environmental science, policy, and decision-making processes."

Although TEK is not currently recognized as an important component of mainstream environmental decision making, scientists are working on developing core science competency programs that align with TEK and promote self-sufficiency and determination. The lack of recognition for traditional ecological knowledge in determining solutions to environmental issues is representational of the ethnocentric tendency to value science over traditional models. Therefore, agencies integrating science and TEK must acknowledge the values of unique pedagogical methods in order to fully utilize the benefits of both science and TEK. For example, US agencies must learn about TEK through the lens of indigenous groups by working side by side with Indigenous Elders, gather hands-on data from the specific place in question, and incorporating indigenous values into their scientific evaluation.

In November 2000, U.S. President Bill Clinton issued Executive Order 13175, which required federal departments and agencies to consult with Indian Tribal governments in the development of policies that would have Tribal implications. Tribal Implications are defined by the EPA as having "substantial direct effects on one or more Indian tribes, on the relationship between the federal government and Indian tribes, or on the distribution of power and responsibilities between the federal government and Indian tribes." As a Federal agency of the U.S. government, the EPA was required to establish a set of standards for the consultation process. As its initial response, the agency developed a set of standards that would allow for meaningful communication and coordination between the agency and tribal officials prior to the agency taking actions or implementing decisions that may affect tribes. The standards also designated EPA consultation contacts to promote consistency and coordination of the consultation process, and established management oversight and reporting to ensure accountability and transparency.

One form of consultation has been EPA Tribal Councils. In 2000, the EPA's Office of Research and Development formed the EPA Tribal Science Council. The council, made up of representatives from tribes across the nation, is meant to provide a structure for tribal involvement in EPA's science efforts, and serve as a vehicle through which EPA may gain an understanding of the scientific issues that are of highest priority to tribes at a national level. The council also offers tribes an opportunity to influence EPA's scientific agenda by raising these priority issues to an EPA-wide group.

Of importance for tribal members at the initial gathering of the EPA Tribal Science Council was the inherent differences in tribal traditional lifeways and western science. These lifeways include "spiritual, emotional, physical, and mental connections to the environment; connections which are based on intrinsic, immeasurable values"; and an understanding that the earth's resources will provide everything necessary for human survival.

The EPA's Tribal Science Council, however, was meant to act as a meeting place where both groups could "share information that may contribute to environmental protection for all peoples with neither culture relinquishing its identity." In an effort to protect TTL the Council identified subsitence as a critical area for investigation. The EPA-Tribal Science Council defined subsistence as: the "relationships between people and their surrounding environment, a way of living. Subsistence involves an intrinsic spiritual connection to the earth, and includes an understanding that the earth's resources will provide everything necessary for human survival. People who subsist from the earth's basic resources remain connected to those resources, living within the circle of life. Subsistence is about living in a way that will ensure the integrity of the earth's resources for the beneficial use of generations to come." Because TTL or TEK is specific to a location and includes the relationships between plants and animals, and the relationship of living beings to the environment, acknowledgment of subsitence as a priority allows for the knowledge and practices of TTL to be protected. For example, as part of their deliberation regarding subsistence, the Council agreed to identify resource contamination as "the most critical tribal science issue at this time." Because tribal people with subsistence lifestyles rely the environment for traditional techniques of farming, hunting. fishing, forestry, and medicines, and ceremonies, contaminants disproportionately impact tribal peoples and jeopardizes their TTL. As the EPA Council stated, "Tribal subsistence consumption rates are typically many times higher than those of the general population, making the direct impact of resource contamination a much more immediate concern." As native peoples struggle with tainted resources, the council has made progress in investigating its impacts.

Despite such efforts, there are still barriers to progress within the EPA-Tribal Science Council. For example, one obstacle has been the nature of TTL. Tribal Traditional Lifeways are passed down orally, from person to person, generation to generation, whereas western science relies on the written word, communicated through academic and literate transmission. Endeavors to bring together western scientists and tribal people have also been hindered by Native American's perceptions that scientific analysis are put in a metaphorical "black box" that shuts out tribal input. Regardless, the EPA has recognized the ability of indigenous knowledge to advance scientific understanding and provide new information and perspectives that may benefit the environment and human health.

The integration of TTL into the EPA's risk assessment paradigm is one example of how the EPA-Tribal Science Council has been able to enact change in EPA culture. The risk assessment paradigm is an "organizing framework for the scientific analysis of the potential for harmful impacts to human health and the environment as a result of exposure to contaminants or other environmental stressors." Risk assessment has been used by the EPA to establish "clean-up levels at hazardous waste sites, water quality and air quality criteria, fish advisories, and bans or restricted uses for pesticides and other toxic chemicals." Tribal people are concerned, however, that current risk assessment methodologies do not afford complete value to tribal culture, values, and/or life ways. The Tribal Science Council seeks to incorporate TTL into exposure assumptions existent in the EPA risk assessment model. A long-term goal for the EPA's Tribal Science Council, however, is a complete shift in decision-making assessments from risk to preserving a healthy people and environment. As stated above, tribal people do not accept a separation of the human and ecological condition when they characterize risk. Through EPA initiated seminar, workshops, and projects, tribes have been able to engage in dialogue about the integration of Tribal Traditional Lifeways into EPA risk assessment and decision-making. This has occurred in a number of ways: inclusion of unique tribal cultural activities such as native basketry, the importance of salmon and other fishes, native plant medicine, consumption of large amounts of fish and game, and sweat lodges as exposures for estimating potential risk to people or to communities. Although these types of tribal specific activities may be included in EPA's risk assessment, there is no assurance that they will be included nor is there consistency in how they may be applied at different sites across the country.

In July 2014, the EPA announced its "Policy on Environmental Justice for Working with Federally Recognized Tribes and Indigenous Peoples," setting forth its principles for programs related to federally recognized tribes and indigenous peoples in order to "support the fair and effective implementation of federal environmental laws, and provide protection from disproportionate impacts and significant risks to human health and the environment." Among the 17 principles were #3 ("The EPA works to understand definitions of human health and the environment from the perspective of federally recognized tribes, indigenous peoples throughout the United States, and others living in Indian country"); #6 ("The EPA encourages, as appropriate and to the extent practicable and permitted by law, the integration of traditional ecological knowledge into the agency's environmental science, policy, and decision-making processes, to understand and address environmental justice concerns and facilitate program implementation"); and #7 ("The EPA considers confidentiality concerns regarding information on sacred sites, cultural resources, and other traditional knowledge, as permitted by law."). While this policy identifies guidelines and procedures for the EPA in regards to environmental justice principles as they relate to tribes and indigenous peoples, the agency noted that they are in no way applicable as rules or regulations. They cannot be applied to particular situations nor change or substitute any law, regulation, or any other legally-binding requirement and is not legally enforceable.

Effects of environmental degradation on traditional knowledge
In some areas, environmental degradation has led to a decline in traditional ecological knowledge. For example, at the Aamjiwnaang community of Anishnaabe First Nations people in Sarnia, Ontario, Canada, residents suffer from a "noticeable decrease in male birth ratio ..., which residents attribute to their proximity to petrochemical plants":

Climate change

Traditional ecological knowledge provides information about climate change across generations and geography of the actual residents in the area. Traditional ecological knowledge emphasizes and makes the information about the health and interactions of the environment the center of the information it carries. Climate change affects traditional ecological knowledge in the forms of the indigenous people's identity and the way they live their lives. Traditional knowledge is passed down from generation to generation and continues today.  Indigenous people depend on these traditions for their livelihood. For many harvesting seasons, indigenous people have shifted their activity months earlier due to impacts from climate change.

The rising temperature poses as threats for ecosystems because it harms the livelihoods of certain tree and plant species. The combination of the rise in temperatures and change in precipitation levels affects plant growth locations.

The warming also affects insects and animals. The change in temperatures can affect many aspects from the times that insects emerge throughout the year to the changes in the habitats of animals throughout seasonal changes.

As the temperature gets hotter, wild fires become more likely. One Indigenous nation in Australia was recently given back land and are reinstating their traditional practice of controlled burning. This has resulted in increased biodiversity and decreased severity of wildfires.

Not only are different aspects of the environment affected, but together, the health of the ecosystem is affected by climate change and so the environmental resources available to the indigenous people can change in the amount available and the quality of the resources.

As sea ice levels decrease, Alaska Native peoples experience changes in their daily lives; fishing, transportation, social and economic aspects of their lives become more unsafe. The defrosting of soil has caused damages to buildings and roadways. Water contamination becomes exacerbated as clean water resources dwindle.

Climate changes undermine the daily lives of the Native peoples on many levels. Climate change and indigenous people have a varying relationship depending on the geographic region which require different adaption and mitigation actions. For example, to immediately deal with these conditions, the indigenous people adjust when they harvest and what they harvest and also adjust their resource use. Climate change can change the accuracy of the information of traditional ecological knowledge. The indigenous people have relied deeply on indicators in nature to plan activities and even for short- term weather predictions. As a result of even more increasing unfavorable conditions, the indigenous people relocate to find other ways to survive. As a result, there is a loss of cultural ties to the lands they once resided on and there is also a loss to the traditional ecological knowledge they had with the land there. Climate change adaptations not properly structured or implemented can harm the indigenous people's rights.

The EPA has mentioned that it would take traditional ecological knowledge into consideration in planning adaptations to climate change. The National Resource Conservation Service of the United States Department of Agriculture has used methods of the indigenous people to combat climate change conditions.

Case study: Savoonga and Shaktoolik, Alaska

In one study, villagers of Savoonga and Shaktoolik, Alaska reported that over the last twenty years of their lives, the weather has become more difficult to predict, the colder season has shortened, there is more difficulty in predicting the amount of plants available for harvests, there are differences in animal migrations, there are more sightings of new species than before, and the activities of hunting and gathering have become not as predictable nor occur as often due to more limited availability to do so. The residents saw a noticeable change in their climate which also affected their livelihoods. The plants and animals are not as consistent with their availability which affects the residents' hunting and gathering because there is not as much to hunt or gather. The appearance of new species of plants and animals is also a physical and nutritional safety concern because they are not traditionally part of the land.

Tribally Specific TEK

Karuk and Yurok Burning as TEK 
According to environmental sociologist Kirsten Vinyeta and tribal climate change researcher Kathy Lynn, "the Karuk Tribe of California occupies aboriginal land along the middle course of the Klamath and Salmon Rivers in Northern California. The Tribe's aboriginal territory includes an estimated 1.38 million acres within the Klamath River Basin. Traditional burning practices have been critical to the Karuk since time immemorial. For the Tribe, fire serves as a critical land management tool as well as a spiritual practice." According to environmental studies professor Tony Marks-Block, ecological researcher Frank K. Lake and tropical forester Lisa M. Curran, "before widespread fire exclusion policies, American Indians used to broadcast understory fires or cultural burns to enhance resources integral for their livelihood and cultural practices. To restore ecocultural resources depleted from decades of fire exclusion and to reduce wildfire risks, the Karuk and the Yurok Tribes of Northwest California are leading regional collaborative efforts to expand broadcast fires and fuel reduction treatments on public, private, and Tribal lands in their ancestral territories."

Tony Marks-Block, Frank K. Lake and Lisa M. Curran also state that "in Karuk territory, the federal government did not establish a reservation, leaving merely 3.83 square kilometers of Karuk trust lands in their ancestral territory, with the remainder largely under the jurisdiction of the Klamath and Six Rivers National Forests and scattered private homesteads. As a result, Karuk Tribal members and management agencies must navigate the USDA Forest Service claims on their ancestral territory and have limited options to expand their land base through the acquisition of private land holdings. In Yurok territory, multiple overlapping jurisdictions occur including Redwood National Park and Six Rivers National Forest outside of the reservation established by the federal government. The reservation is under private timber company ownership. Consequently, the Yurok Tribe must either coordinate or interact with multiple actors within their ancestral territory, but they presently have greater options for acquiring private properties than the Karuk Tribe." According to professor of sociology Kari Norgaard and Karuk tribe member William Tripp, "this process can then be replicated and expanded to other communities throughout the western Klamath Mountains and beyond. Hoopa and Yurok tanoak stands that experienced repeated fire were more resilient to the disease over time. Some research indicates dramatic differences in disease incidence immediately following wildfire (72 times less likely to be found in burned versus unburned plots in the same area), although it has been shown to steadily recover in the absence of repeated fire, because the disease can survive in hosts not killed by the fire."

Anishinabe Ecological Conservation as TEK 
According to authors Bobbie Kalman and Niki Walker, "indigenous, or Native, people have lived in the Great Lakes region for thousands of years. People of the Anishinabe (Anishinaabe) nation lived in territories in the western Great Lakes region. According to oral tradition, the Anishinabe people once lived by a huge body of salt water, which may have been the Atlantic Ocean or Hudson's Bay. The people received a prophecy, or prediction, that if they traveled inland, they would find a place where food grew on water. Some went west, following a vision of a megis, or cowrie shell, that guided them to the western Great Lakes. The people split into groups and settled in different spots that together made up the Anishinabe nation. The Anishinabe had an especially close relationship with two other nations in the western Great Lakes region being the Odawa (Ottawa) and Potawatomi. People of these three nations often married one another, traded goods, and worked together to settle disputes. They also gathered at councils, where they made decisions together."

According to indigenous philosopher and climate/environmental justice scholar Kyle Powys Whyte, "Anishinabe people throughout the Great Lakes region are at the forefront of native species conservation and ecological restoration. Nmé is the largest and oldest living fish in the Great Lakes basin, sometimes exceeding 100 years in age. Nmé served the Asnishinabe people as a substantial source of food, an indicator species for monitoring the environment, and a lachlan identity, playing a role in ceremonies and stories. Kenny Pheasant, an elder says, "Decline of the sturgeon has corresponded with decline in sturgeon clan families. Only a few sturgeon clan families are known around here" (Little River Band). The Natural Resources Department of the Ottawa Indians started a cultural context group, composed of a diverse range of tribal members and biologists, which developed goals and objectives for restoration. The goal was to "restore the harmony and connectivity between Nmé and the Anishinabe people and bring them both back to the river. Ultimately, the department created the first streamside rearing facility for protecting young sturgeon before they are released each fall in order to preserve their genetic parentage. Wild rice, or manoomin, grows in shallow, clear, and slow-moving waterways and can be harvested in early autumn. After harvesting, manoomin is processed through activities such as drying, parching, hulling, winnowing, and cleaning. After the Anishinabe migrated from the East and reached the Great Lakes region where they could grow crops on the water, neighboring groups of US and Canadian citizens and companies engaged in activities such as mining, damming, commercial farming and recreational boating. These activities directly affect manoomin and its habitat. Today the Anishinabe people are leaders in the conservation of wild rice. The Nibi (water) and Manoomin Symposium, which takes place every two years, brings tribal rice harvesters in the Great Lakes, indigenous scholars, paddy rice growers, representatives from mining companies and state agencies, and university researchers interested in the genetic modification of rice together. Elders share their stories about manoomin and youth share their perspective on how manoomin fits into their futures. Indigenous persons working as scientists in their tribes share the experiences working with elders to understand the deep historical implications of the work they do to study and conserve manoomin. Other indigenous people are often invited to share their experiences restoring and conserving other native species, such as taro and maize."

Lummi Nation of Washington State Conservation of Southern Resident Killer Whales as TEK 
According to ecological scholars Paul Guernsey, Kyle Keeler and Lummi member Jeremiah Julius, "the Lummi Nation of Washington State is a native American tribe of the Salish Sea. In 2018, the Lummi Nation dedicated itself to a Totem Pole Journey across the United States calling for the return of their relative "Lolita" (a Southern Resident Killer Whale) to her home waters. In the Salish language, killer whales are referred to as qwe 'lhol mechen, meaning 'our relations under the waves', but the Lummi are not simply 'related to' the whales in a generic fashion, the whales are a relation in the sense that they are kin. When NOAA first designated the Southern Resident killer whale an endangered distinct population segment (DPS) in 2005, they juridically eliminated "Lolita" as a family member. The decision reads, "The Southern Resident killer whale DPS does not include killer whales from J, K or L pod placed in captivity prior to listing, nor does it include their captive born progeny" (NOAA, 2005). The Lummi are asking for NOAA to collaborate in feeding the whales until the chinook runs of the Puget Sound can sustain them. The Lummi have embarked on ceremonial feedings of their relatives, but they are told by NOAA that larger-scale efforts would require federal permission and partnership. Although one of the organization's conservation goals is to ensure 'sufficient quantity, quality and accessibility of prey species', NOAA understands this policy strictly as a habitat issue. They have been clear that now is not the time for complacency due to 'insufficient data' or uncertainty. The Lummi continue their annual Totem Pole Journey to protect their older siblings, the blackfish, and to keep coal, oil and other threats out of the Salish Sea. These healing practices are fashioned to address what Maria Yellow Horse Brave Heart and Lemyra M. DeBruyn have called "historical unresolved grief"."

See also
Agroecology
Braiding Sweetgrass
Non-timber forest product
Traditional knowledge
African Insect TEK
Indigenous science

References

Notes

Further reading 
 
Robin Wall Kimmerer (2013). Braiding Sweetgrass: Indigenous Wisdom, Scientific Knowledge, and the Teachings of Plants (Milkweed Edition) .

External links
Traditional Ecological Knowledge: Interdisciplinary Stewardship of Mother Earth, National Park Service
Center for Native Peoples and the Environment, at State University of New York, College of Environmental Science and Forestry
Indigenous Peoples' Restoration Network (IPRN)
Gwaii Haanas National Park Reserve and Haida Heritage Site
Table of the Six Faces of TEK

Ecology
Traditional knowledge
Environmental humanities